Viktor Hey may refer to:

Viktor Hey (footballer, born 1974), Ukrainian retired footballer
Viktor Hey (footballer, born 1996), Ukrainian footballer